"Skibidi" is a dance song by Russian rave band Little Big. It was released on 5 October 2018 along with their album Antipositive, Pt. 2 on Warner Music Russia. Ilya Prusikin and the media producer of the group 'Khleb", Lyubim Khomchuk were credited for writing.

The song became a hit in the fall of 2018. The single debuted at number 1 on Top Radio & YouTube Hits. The song achieved wider spread fame due to the music video that was released on the day of the album's premiere.

On January 26 2019, the music video won the category "Hype of the year" of the Ketnet award "Het Gala van de Gouden K's 2018", which took place in Antwerp, Belgium. The song was also nominated for the "ZD Awards-2018" for "Trends of the Year" and "Hype of the Year"., which were presented on February 28, 2019. On February 16 2019, the music video was awarded the "Chart's Dozen" prize for "Best video". On April 10 of the same year, the video was nominated for the awards for "Best video" and "Best Song in a Foreign Language" at the Muz-TV 2019 awards.

The song became an internet meme in late 2018, in part due to the "Skibidi Challenge". The song debuted No. 1 on Tophit in the Russian Commonwealth, where it stayed for two weeks.

"Skibidi" is included in the soundtrack for Just Dance 2020.

Music video 
The music video for "Skibidi" was released alongside the song on 5 October 2018. , the video has over 602 million views. The music video was directed by the band's producer, Alina Pasok.

Skibidi Challenge 
When the video went viral, Little Big challenged fans to post their own Skibidi dance videos, which they called the "Skibidi Challenge".

In October 2018 on the British television program This Week host Andrew Neil challenged his guest panelists Michael Portillo, a British journalist and former politician, and British Labour Party politician Caroline Flint to dance the Skibidi.  Guest Bobby Gillespie remained still on the set as the three unsuccessfully tried to perform the dance, which became an internet meme of its own.

Charts

References 

2018 songs
Number-one singles in Russia
2018 singles
Little Big (band) songs
Internet memes introduced in 2018
Viral videos
Internet memes introduced from Russia